Diaporthe melonis is a fungal plant pathogen.

References

Fungal plant pathogens and diseases
melonis
Fungi described in 1957